Frank Hill (1906–1993) was a Scottish football player and manager.

Frank Hill may also refer to:

 Frank Harrison Hill (1830–1910), English journalist
 Frank E. Hill (Medal of Honor) (1850–1906), American Medal of Honor recipient (American Indian Wars)
 Frank Hill (Medal of Honor) (1864–?), American Medal of Honor recipient (Spanish–American War)
 Frank Hill (rugby union) (1866–1927), Welsh international rugby union player
 Frank Ebenezer Hill (1880–1932), American peacetime Medal of Honor recipient
 Frank Hill (Australian politician) (1883–1945), Australian politician
 Frank Ackerman Hill (1919–2012), American military airman and WWII Fighter Ace
 Frank Hill (scientist) (born 1951), American astrophysicist
 Frank Hill (Australian footballer) (1914–1976), Australian rules footballer
 Frank Hill (American politician), American politician in the state of California
 Frank Pierce Hill (1855–1941), American librarian

 Jules Strongbow (born 1962), U.S. pro-wrestler with the ringname Chief Frank Hill

See also 
 Francis Hill (disambiguation)
 Hill (surname)